National Highways Authority may refer to:
 National Highways Authority of India
 National Highway Authority (Pakistan)